Micol Di Segni (born 29 December 1987 in Rome) is an Italian professional Mixed martial artist and Alternative model for the website SuicideGirls since 2007.

She has been a pin-up model for the punk rock website SuicideGirls since 2007, featured in more than 20 photoshoots, 2 hard cover books ("Hard Girls, Soft Light" and "Geekology"), magazines and DVD ("UK Holiday").  
Also known as Eden Von Hell, she has been featured in many Italian TV shows, movies, radio shows (like the Late Show on Rai Radio 2 and Non è un lavoro per donne on Radio Rock), and on the pages of international magazines like Men's Health, GQ, Inked (magazine) and Tattoo Life.

Mixed martial arts career

Amateur career 

Micol made her amateur MMA debut in 2014 gaining the flyweight spot in the Italian National Team. She competed at the International Mixed Martial Arts Federation 2014 World Championship in Las Vegas, conquering a bronze medal after three hard fought rounds in the semifinals against the Brazilian Amanda Ribas. The next year she became the Flyweight World Champion defeating the Swedish Anja Saxmark in the finals of the IMMAF 2015 World Championships.

Professional career 

Signed with the SouthAfrican promotion Extreme Fighting Championship (EFC)  to make her professional debut in October 2015, she faced Danella Eliasov to gain a unanimous decision win. After a second EFC bout at flyweight against Shana Power in June 2016, she started to divide her training camps between Rome and Albuquerque. At the Jackson Wink MMA Academy she had the chance to confront and master her skills with some of the best fighters in the world. After dropping down to strawweight, she went on a 5 fights winning streak, mostly by finishing her opponents before the bell ring, taking her to become the first Italian female to fight in European and international events like Cage Warriors, RXF, Brave Combat Federation and Dana White's Contender Series.
At the beginning of 2020 the Spanish promotion AFL announced the first female only MMA event in Europe, with Micol Di Segni as the first contender for the inSheElizabeth lstrawweight title.

The historic event got postponed to October 2020, with the title fight DiSegni vs Kerouche as the main event.
Micol Di Segni conquered the inaugural strawweight title defeating her opponent with ground and pound strikes during the third round of the main event of the “AFL Valkyries - DiSegni vs Kerouche” card.

After winning a year later at Venator FC 8 via TKO stoppage in the second round against Adriana Fusini on October 30, 2021, DiSegni appeared at Ares FC 4 on March 10, 2022 against Eizabeth Rodrigues. She lost the bout via split decision.

DiSegni appeared at Cage Warriors 144 on October 7, 2022 against Bryony Tyrell. He won the bout via unanimous decision.

Championships and accomplishments

IMMAF 

 Flyweight Bronze Medalist 2014
 Flyweight World Champion 2015

AFL 

 First Strawweight Champion

Mixed martial arts record 

|-
|Win
|align=center|10–4
|Bryony Tyrell
|Decision (unanimous)
|Cage Warriors 144
|
|align=center|3
|align=center|5:00
|Rome, Italy
|
|-
|Loss
|align=center|9–4
|Elizabeth Rodrigues
|Decision (split)
|Ares FC 4
|
|align=center|3
|align=center|5:00
|Paris, France
|
|-
|Win
|align=center|9–3
|Adriana Fusini
|TKO (punches)
|Venator FC 8
|
|align=center|2
|align=center|4:07
|Montecatini Terme, Italy
|
|-
|Win
|align=center|8–3
|Audrey Kerouche
|TKO (punches)
|AFL: Valkyries
|
|align=center|3
|align=center|3:22
|Barcelona, Spain
|
|-
|Loss
|align=center|7–3
|Mallory Martin
|Decision (unanimous)
|Dana White's Contender Series 25
|
|align=center|3
|align=center|5:00
|Las Vegas, Nevada, United States
|
|-
|Win
|align=center|7–2
|Nikolina Vokic
|Submission (rear naked choke)
|Day in the Cage 4
| 
|align=center|1
|align=center|1:10
|Monte Urano, Italy
|
|-
|Loss
|align=center|6–2
|Maria Ribeiro
|TKO (punches)
|Brave CF 20
| 
|align=center|1
|align=center|1:09
|Hyderabad, India
|
|-
|Win
|align=center|6–1
|Cory McKenna
|Decision (split) 
|Cage Warriors 97
| 
|align=center|3
|align=center|5:00
|Cardiff, Wales, United Kingdom
|-
|Win
|align=center|5–1
|Elena Belaya
|Submission (armbar) 
|Fight Club Championship
| 
|align=center|1
|align=center|1:40
|Sassari, Italy
|
|-
|Win
|align=center|4–1
|Samin Kamal Beik
|TKO (punches)
|Kombat League: Magnum FC 4
| 
|align=center|2
|align=center|2:37
|Verona, Italy
|
|-
|Win
|align=center|3–1
|Alina Drimba 
|TKO (punches)
|RXF 29: All Stars 
| 
|align=center|1
|align=center|2:01
|Brașov, Romania
|
|-
|Win
|align=center|2–1
|Anastasia Gornostaeva
|Decision (unanimous)
|Kombat League: Magnum 2
| 
|align=center|3
|align=center|5:00
|Roma, Italy
|
|-
|Loss
|align=center|1–1
|Shana Power
|Decision (unanimous)
|EFC Worldwide 50
| 
|align=center|3
|align=center|5:00
|Sun City, South Africa
|
|-
|Win
|align=center|1–0
|Danella Eliasov
|Decision (unanimous)
|EFC Worldwide 44
| 
|align=center|3
|align=center|5:00
|Johannesburg, South Africa
|
|-

References

External links 
 
 
 
Eden Von Hell: tatuaggi sul ring
Eden Von Hell in Elena Atzori's "fujiroids"
Eden Von Hell – ArtAbout Magazine

1987 births
Living people
Italian female mixed martial artists
Strawweight mixed martial artists
Mixed martial artists utilizing Muay Thai
Mixed martial artists utilizing wrestling
Italian Muay Thai practitioners
Female Muay Thai practitioners
Sportspeople from Rome
Italian female adult models
Models from Rome